The bullet catch is a stage magic illusion in which a magician appears to catch a bullet fired directly at them ⁠— often in the mouth, sometimes in the hand or sometimes caught with other items such as a dinner plate. The bullet catch may also be referred to as the bullet trick, defying the bullets or occasionally the gun trick.

In performance
The trick usually involves a gun which is loaded and operated by someone with a knowledge of firearms to demonstrate that no deception is being used. In most instances, the bullet is marked by an audience member so that it can be identified later. Great efforts are usually made to show that the person firing the gun does not come in contact with the person catching the bullet. When magicians Penn and Teller perform the bullet catch, in which each simultaneously catches a bullet shot by the other, a line is drawn down the center of the stage, demonstrating that neither will cross to the other side. When done by Dorothy Dietrich and Ted Annemann, the bullets are purchased by a committee ahead of time, kept under guard until performance time, and the bullets are chosen at random at the time of the performance.

The gun is then fired through a target (usually a pane of glass, which shatters or is penetrated by a bullet hole) to demonstrate that the gun has actually fired a bullet and the catcher didn't just hide a bullet in his mouth or hand all along. The performer catching the bullet usually collapses, apparently as a result of performing such a feat, and then rises to produce the bullet which is most often spat onto a plate or tray. Historical accounts of the bullet catch describe the bullet being caught in a handkerchief, in a bottle, on a plate or even on the tip of a sword. In more recent times, magicians such as Dorothy Dietrich (1981), and later Criss Angel (2000s), and David Blaine (2008) have appeared to catch the bullet in a metal cup in their mouth. The guns that Penn and Teller use in their effect are fitted with laser sights to add to the suspense and drama of the trick, and the magicians present the bullets still between their teeth, before removing them from their mouths.

Method

As is often the case with magic illusions, there is no single way the bullet catch is performed. The method used varies from performer to performer. The gun or the bullet is rigged in some way; in the simplest form of the bullet catch, the gun is made to fire blanks, and the target through which the 'bullet' passes is set to destruct using a squib. All the performer must do is keep the bullet in his or her mouth until ready to produce it.

If the gun is to be loaded in front of the audience, a wax bullet is loaded into the firearm. The spray of liquid wax from the barrel of the gun is enough to break the pane of glass. The magician uses misdirection to exchange the marked bullet with one made of wax and place the marked bullet into his or her mouth.

Another method when doing the trick with a muzzle-loading gun that is loaded in front of the audience or by an audience member is to have a magnetic, rather than lead, bullet. A small magnet attached to the ramrod pulls the bullet back out immediately after loading. When the magician takes the rod, he or she removes the bullet and transfers it to his or her mouth. In this version of the trick the gun is always modified, and only simulates firing a shot. This technique is virtually obsolete, however, because modern firearms do not use a ramrod.

Another method was to use an entirely real and lethal gun and bullet, and simply have the shooter intentionally miss the magician, who has previously collected the bullet to 'catch', as before. This procedure led to most early deaths from this trick and has since been abandoned.

In cases where the bullet is marked by an audience member, the marked bullet is then transferred to the magician through sleight-of-hand, or similar markings are made on another bullet by an off-stage assistant, who then transfers it to the magician.

Chung Ling Soo (the stage name of the American magician William Ellsworth Robinson) was killed while performing this trick due to an equipment malfunction. The gun used for the trick was set up to discharge a blank in the ramrod tube below the barrel. However, the gun malfunctioned and the bullet that had been loaded into the main barrel was accidentally fired into Soo's lung.

History
One of the earliest documentations of the bullet catch appeared in Jean Chassanion's Histoires mémorables des grans & merveilleux iugements et punitions de Dieu (1586), translated as The Theatre of God's Judgements by Reverend Thomas Beard in 1597. In the source, the magician is considered to have made himself invulnerable by black magic, but a trick by sleight of hand and prepared equipment is clearly being described, despite this misunderstanding. In Beard's version:
"It is not long since there was in Lorraine, a certaine man called Coulen, that was overmuch giuen to this cursed Art, amongst whose tricks this was one to be wondred at: that he would suffer Harquebouses or a pistoll to be shot at him, and catch their bullets in his hand without receiving any hurt". 
God's punishment for this use of the cursed art of black magic follows: "but vpon a certaine time one of his seruants being angry with him, hot him such a knock with a pistoll (notwithstanding all his great cunning) that he killed him therewith". (The Theatre of God's Judgements (1597), p. 120: "hot him" is an obsolete spelling for the past tense of "hit him".)

Throughout the 18th century, variations of the bullet catch were developed by a number of street performers.

In his 1785 book Natural Magic or Physical Amusements Revealed, Philip Astley wrote that he himself had invented the trick in 1762. However, two books published in 1761 mentioned the bullet catch as described by Reverend Beard: The Conjuror Unmasked by Thomas Denton, and La Magie blanche dévoilée by Henri Decremps (the former an English translation of the French text). In fact, Astley's publication plagiarized much of its material from Descremps, including a similar cover illustration, but altered the material to depict conjurers in a more positive light.

Between 1813 and 1818, a troupe known as the 'Indian Jugglers', advertised as being from Seringapatam, included the trick in their shows given in London and Dublin. In 1817 The Times carried a report of a fatal accident in Dublin, allegedly caused when a pistol 'actually loaded with powder and ball was, by mistake, substituted for that prepared in the usual way.' In a later newspaper item however the chief of the troupe, Mr Ramusamee, denied this story, stating that no-one had ever been killed.

Around 1840, Scottish magician John Henry Anderson began demonstrating the gun trick in theatres throughout Britain. Anderson, or "The Great Wizard of the North" as he was called, performed for P.T. Barnum, Czar Nicholas, Queen Victoria, and Prince Albert and toured in the United States and Australia, thus bringing the bullet catch into mainstream magic illusions. At least four of Anderson's rivals adapted and imitated his trick in their own performances. The American magician John Wyman, also known as "Wyman the Wizard," purchased the technique from Anderson and began performing the trick himself, popularizing it to such a degree that the bullet catch was for a time known as "Wyman's gun trick."

Injuries and deaths

The bullet catch is arguably one of the most dangerous and daring illusions that a magician can attempt, even when performed in a controlled situation. Legends surround the trick, claiming that more than 12 magicians have been killed while performing it.

Although there are few documented cases of death, there are several accounts of the performer being shot. The number of deaths surrounding the bullet catch has given rise to a story that the trick carries with it a curse to those who attempt to perform it, though in reality there have been far more successful performances than fatalities. These magicians often include stories of death, dismemberment and curses as part of the staging of many tricks in order to build up hype.

Thomas Frost in his 1876 book The Lives of the Conjurors wrote of two separate performers in the 1820s, Torrini De Grisy and De Linsky, who were responsible for the deaths of their son and wife, respectively. In 1869, a performer by the name of Dr. Epstein was killed when the tip of the wand he was using to ram the charge into the gun broke off inside and was subsequently launched at him when the gun was fired.

The best documented instance of a performer being killed while performing the gun trick is the case of Chung Ling Soo, who was shot dead when a musket altered for use on stage actually fired in London in 1918. This event ended the popularity of the bullet catch trick for nearly 70 years. Escape artist and daredevil Harry Houdini considered performing a bullet catch, but Harry Kellar convinced him otherwise.

Performances in the past century
American mentalist Theodore Annemann presented a dramatic outdoor version of the bullet catch throughout his career in the 1930s until his death in 1942.

German magician Ralf Bialla started to perform the bullet catch in the 1950s for a fee of 2,000 DM a performance. He wore bullet-proof glasses, strong gloves on his hands with which he covered parts of his face, and his front teeth were made of steel. A .22 rifle was fired, and the bullet had to go through three glass panes before Bialla caught it with his teeth. He was seriously wounded nine times but survived. He was portrayed in the 1972 documentary film Wer schießt auf Ralf Bialla?. He died in 1975 after falling off a cliff, supposedly because of constant dizziness caused by the injuries.

In 1964, Nigel Backhurst (who later performed as Nigel Gordon) developed a version of the bullet catch using a .22 air rifle, which he performed for his membership audition to the Staffordshire Magical Society. He later wrote an article describing the method used in Abracadabra and continued to perform the effect until 2000 with the Theatre of The Damned.

In July 1980, Dorothy Dietrich was booked to perform her version of the bullet catch for the International Brotherhood of Magicians, and to be featured on the TV show Evening Magazine. Her version differed in that she allowed an independent committee to buy and bring the bullets under guard. In 1988, she performed the bullet catch in a performance at Donald Trump's Resorts International in Atlantic City for the casino's 10th anniversary. This was shown throughout the world on a TV special called Just for the Record, The best of everything. On another occasion, she performed the trick on the television show You Asked for It, hosted by Rich Little.  On yet another occasion, she performed it for the Canadian Broadcasting Corporation on a show called Autobus du Canada, and received the highest amount ever paid to a magician by Canadian television. She advertised that she was the only woman to perform the bullet catch in her mouth. Dorothy Dietrich is mentioned on the hit show House MD in a segment about her bullet catch. (Year 8, Segment 8, "Perils of Paranoia").

In 2006, the bullet catch trick was tested on the TV show MythBusters. The crew used a slaughtered pig's head to see if it were feasible for a human jaw to withstand the force of a bullet. Despite having stronger teeth than a human, the pig's teeth and jaw were badly damaged. After judging the trick "busted", the crew was challenged to design a precisely timed mechanical bullet catching rig. This device was only modestly successful at catching a bullet, and only after the "jaws" were switched from a human shaped metal jaw to a longer duckbill one with more surface area. Even with perfect timing aided by ultra-high speed photography, the bullet deteriorated into an almost unrecognizable mass of metal upon impact.

Criss Angel has performed the trick at least twice. In a radio interview with Penn Jillette in February 2006, Angel says there is an unaired performance that was "so believable" that the television network A&E would not broadcast it. In this performance, his musician friend Jonathan Davis appeared to fire a high-powered rifle into a metal cup that was custom-made to fit into Criss' mouth. On episode 3 of Criss Angel BeLIEve, Angel performs a version of the trick using a padded glove.

David Blaine performs a version of the bullet catch in which he catches the bullet in his mouth with a steel shot glass.

Famous performers
 Coulew of Lorraine (France, early 17th century; clubbed to death with his own gun by an irate assistant in 1613)
 Kia Khan Khruse (Britain, shot by spectator in 1818 but not killed)
 Louis de Linsky (Germany, killed his wife in 1829)
 "Torrini" De Grisy (killed his son Giovanni in 1826)
 Annie Vernone (Britain, 1850s)
 John Henry Anderson (Britain, 1860s)
 Alexander Smith (Britain, 1860s)
 Jean Eugène Robert-Houdin (France, 1860s)
 Dr. Epstein (Paris, killed in 1869)
 De Line (killed his son in 1890)
 The Great Herrmann and, wife, Adelaide (United States, 1890s)
 Oscar Eliason, Dante The Great (the US and Australasia, 1890s)
 Robert (Bob) "Doc" Cunningham (United States, 1890s)
 Michael Hatal (United States, shot by audience member in 1899)
 "Bosco" Blumenfeld (Switzerland, shot by audience member in 1906)
 Edvin Lindberg (Germany, killed in 1905)
 Chung Ling Soo (London, killed in 1918)
 Theodore Annemann (United States, 1930s)
 Jean Hugard (Australia, 1940s)
 Maurice Fogel (Britain, 1940s–1960s), wounded at least once
 Maurice Rooklyn (Australia, 1950s)
 The Great Carson (Jack Carson) (Australia 1953)
 Prince Sil (India, 1978s)
 Ralf Bialla (Germany, 1950s – 1975), wounded nine times, starring in the documentary "Wer schießt auf Ralf Bialla?" (1972) by Hans-Dieter Grabe
 Robert Culp and Morgan Fairchild "Circus of the Stars" (United States, 1982)
 Dorothy Dietrich (United States, 1981)
 Carl Skenes (United States, 1980s)
 Ben Robinson (United States, 1980s)
 Paul Daniels (Britain, 1980s)
 Steven "Banachek" Shaw (United States, 1980s)
 Val Valentino, with a gimmicked gun, as the Masked Magician in the show "Breaking the Magicians' Code: Magic's Biggest Secrets Finally Revealed"
 Morgan Strebler (United States, 1990s)
 Tusam (Argentino, 1990s)
 Penn & Teller (United States, 1990s–2010s)
 Joe Labero (Tunisia, 2000s)
 Matt the Knife (United States, 2000s–2010s)
 Criss Angel (United States, 2000s)
 Garrett "Jeffy" Stevenson (United States, 2000s)
 Brock Gill (United States, 2000s)
 David Blaine (United States, September 24, 2008 as a part of "Dive of Death")
 Keith Barry (Ireland, 2010s)
 Steve Cohen, wounded by a glass shard (United States, 2012)
 Alexandre Alexander (Ukraine, August 29, 2011 as a part of "Phenomenon")
 Rob Drummond (London, 2013)

References

Sources
 Harmon, Daniel. "Houdini, The Greatest Showman of All?" in "The New York Times" (November 1, 1981).
 Poundstone, William. Biggest Secrets. 
 Randi, James. Conjuring. 
 Ayres, Mick. "Carl Skenes: Biting the Bullet" in The Linking Ring (November 2000).
 Severn, Bill. The Guide to Magic as a Hobby.

External links
  
 Dorothy Dietrich's Bullet Catch
 Penn & Teller's Double Bullet Catch
 BulletCatch.com, a website devoted to the topic

Magic tricks
Firearms